Question and Answer may refer to:

 Question and Answer (novel), by Poul Anderson, 1954
 Question and Answer (album), by Pat Metheny, Dave Holland, and Roy Haynes, 1989
 "Question and Answer" (Burn Notice), a television episode

See also
 Questions and answers (disambiguation)
 Q&A (disambiguation)